The Naked Kitchen (lit. "Kitchen") is a 2009 South Korean film written and directed by Hong Ji-young. Starring Shin Min-ah, Ju Ji-hoon, and Kim Tae-woo, the film is a romantic comedy-drama about a very curious ménage à trois.

Plot
Ahn Mo-rae and Han Sang-in have been friends since childhood. He didn't mind that she followed him around, calling him hyeong or Big Brother (though Korean girls are supposed to call older guys oppa), and their marital relationship is an odd but appealing mix of hot sex and best buddies. The day of their wedding anniversary is pretty eventful. Mo-rae (Shin Min-ah) cooks breakfast, serving it on their best china, hoping to get Sang-in (Kim Tae-woo) into the mood for love before he goes to work. Sang-in quits his high-end stockbroker job so that he can devote himself to his lifelong dream of running a fancy restaurant. While shopping for an anniversary gift for Sang-in, Mo-rae sneaks into a closed gallery, where she encounters another illicit visitor—a very handsome young man with whom she hides when the gallery owner turns up. Mo-rae, overcome by heat and dizziness, has a sudden sexual encounter with the stranger, who then vanishes. She confesses the incident to her husband, downplaying it both to him and to herself. Then Sang-in tells Mo-rae over dinner that he's expecting a mentor to help him plan the menu for his dream restaurant: a brilliant young French-Korean chef who will arrive that evening. Park Du-re (Ju Ji-hoon),French-Korean mentor, turns out to be Mo-rae's stranger, who now will be staying with the young couple, sleeping in the room that had belonged to Sang-in's late mother. With her husband blissfully unaware of Du-re's identity, he encourages Mo-rae to get along with him. Mo-rae is powerfully drawn to  Du-re while Sang-in gets cooking lessons from him, leading the poor woman to somewhat of a crisis as she tries to decide what her heart really wants. But at the end Mo-rea eventually decides to leave them both.

Cast
Shin Min-a – Ahn Mo-rae
Kim Tae-woo – Han Sang-in
Ju Ji-hoon – Park Du-re 
Jeon Hye-jin – Kim Seon-woo
Park Sang-hun – Kwon Joo-hyeok 
Jung So-yeon – Kwon Ye-rim 
Kwon Hyeok-poong – cooking competition sponsor
Kim Won-joo – cooking competition sponsor
Kwon Yeong-gook – cooking competition sponsor
Kim Bo-yeong – gallery curator 
Min Seong-wook – bond company junior colleague
Kim Joo-yeong – parasol store student couple
Baek Jin-hee – parasol store student couple
Bang Eun-jin – cooking judge (cameo)
Ahn Hye-kyung – radio weather forecaster (cameo)
Chae Yoon-seo – bride at wedding shoot (cameo)
 Lee Hwan – groom at wedding shoot (cameo)

Notes
Actors Shin Min-ah and Ju Ji-hoon previously starred together in the 2007 television series The Devil.

References

External links
 http://blog.naver.com/love_kitchen.do
 
 

2009 films
2000s Korean-language films
South Korean romantic comedy-drama films
2009 romantic comedy-drama films
2000s South Korean films